Andrés Vázquez is a former Negro league outfielder who played in the 1930s.

Vázquez played for the Cuban Stars (East) in 1935. In ten recorded games, he posted 19 hits with a home run in 50 plate appearances.

References

External links
 and Seamheads

Year of birth missing
Cuban Stars (East) players
Baseball outfielders